The Utah Highway Patrol (UHP) is the functional equivalent of state police for the State of Utah in the United States. Its sworn members, known as Troopers, are certified law enforcement officers and have statewide jurisdiction. It was created to "patrol or police the highways within this state of Utah and to enforce the state statutes as required."

The Utah Highway Patrol is a division of the Utah Department of Public Safety.

Rank structure

Issued vehicles and weapons

The UHP  has a mixed fleet of vehicles: Ford CVPI, Dodge Charger, Chevy Suburbans, and multiple Dodge and Ford pickups. The UHP also issues its troopers take-home cars, which can be used within  of their residence. The Ford Mustang SSP was used from 1985 to 1993 and was highly reliable at the time. The Mustang was then superseded by the Ford Crown Victoria Police Interceptor.

The UHP issues its Troopers the Glock 17 Gen 4 9mm caliber or Glock 18 9mm.  (The Glock 18 was, for a time, issued to Section 18: Governor's Security Detail Troopers only). (Troopers may also carry a personal weapon, provided it is chambered in 9mm, .40 S&W, or .45 auto.). Troopers are also issued the Remington 870 12 gauge shotgun, and each patrol vehicle carries a Colt AR-15/M4 carbine rifle. Before issuing AR-15s, The Patrol began participating in a program with the US Government and purchased surplus M-14 rifles. In 2016, the Utah Highway Patrol surrendered all of its M-14 rifles back to the US Government, effectively ending its use of this rifle as a service weapon.  Troopers also carry tasers, expandable batons, and pepper spray.  The carbines are primarily issued to Troopers in urban and densely populated areas. The new issue Sidearm for the UHP is the 17-round Magazine Glock Model 45 MOS 9MM issued with a Holosun Model 509T red dot optics mounted on them.  This sidearm replaced the Glock 17 Gen4 9MM. The UHP still allows their Troopers to carry a personally owned sidearm chambered in 9MM 40S&W and 45ACP.

Fallen officers

Since the establishment of the Utah Highway Patrol in 1923, 16 officers and 1 K9 have died while on duty.

Controversies
The UHP has been involved in several incidents which have gained local, national and international news attention.

DUI Task Force 

Nate Carlisle, in The Salt Lake Tribune, reported that: In a memo in 2010, "Sgt. Rob Nixon said he reviewed 20 of Steed's arrests for driving under the influence of drugs and found in seven of those cases, toxicology tests showed the driver had only a low amount of drugs, referred to as metabolite. Four other drivers had no drugs in their system", according to Nixon's memo. Yet in every case, Steed wrote reports claiming the drivers showed signs of impairment, such as dilated pupils and leg and body tremors. Nixon referred to "a pattern" of conflicting information between Steed's arrest reports and the laboratory results and said: "This is something that needs to be addressed before defense attorneys catch on and her credibility along with the DUI squad's credibility is compromised."

UHP last year said they addressed some of Nixon's concerns with Steed, but apparently no formal review was done until Winward undertook it. Fuhr said the Winward review demonstrates Steed always had cause to suspect the person she arrested was impaired or otherwise not supposed to drive. Even in the few cases where the toxicology tests did not reveal drugs, an admission of recent drug use or other suspicious signs could be used as evidence to convict someone of a charge of driving with a controlled substance in their system.

Also, the Nixon memo has been misinterpreted, Fuhr said. Nixon was not accusing Steed of arresting innocent people, but rather saying she sometimes arrested people on suspicion of the wrong charge; Utah has separate offenses for drivers under the influence of drugs and those who only have drugs in their system.

Nixon's memo also described helping Steed arrest a man who showed little sign of impairment, but whom Steed reported to be exhibiting dilated pupils and tremors. Fuhr said Nixon got that case wrong, and pointed to documents saying the driver admitted to using meth two days earlier, and was "pretty hooked." Documents indicated he tested positive for meth. Steed's report said she also found a baggy with white powder and a pipe with meth residue. The court case was not so cut-and-dried. After that driver was charged in Salt Lake County Justice Court with misdemeanor DUI, drug possession and two traffic violations, charges were dismissed in 2011. A court docket says the prosecutor dismissed the charges for "evidentiary reasons." Attorneys in the case did not respond to messages seeking a further explanation. UHP did not make Nixon available for an interview with The Tribune.

Hamilton said he has been unable to determine how many of Steed's arrests resulted in successful prosecutions. UHP has said it does not have those numbers. UHP is having to defend Steed in the civil rights lawsuit. Fuhr, who may give a deposition in that case, expressed frustration at news reports saying Steed was fired for making false arrests. She was fired for problems with her testimony, Fuhr said, and UHP has not found evidence Steed manufactured evidence. "When these stories go out," Fuhr said of the false arrest allegations, "it hurts every single trooper."

Lisa Steed was named the Utah Highway Patrol trooper of the year in 2007 for her many many DUI arrests. She was the first woman to receive this award. In court March 27, 2012, Steed admitted she intentionally violated the agency's policies twice during a 2010 traffic stop.

Memorial crosses
On November 20, 2007, a judge ruled that the 14 white crosses erected by the Utah Highway Patrol Association could remain in place. An atheist group had filed suit, claiming the memorials were a violation of the separation of church and state. However, on August 18, 2010, the 10th Circuit Court of Appeals ruled that the white roadside crosses used to memorialize the deaths of 14 Utah Highway Patrol troopers are unconstitutional, government endorsements of religion on public lands. "We hold that these memorials have the impermissible effect of conveying to the reasonable observer the message that the state prefers or otherwise endorses a certain religion." The Utah Highway Patrol Association had claimed that "roadside crosses, in particular, are secular symbols," and have erected signs saying "not a state endorsement of any religion."

Rogue officers

Ernest Wilcock
A former officer from Salt Lake City was convicted of two first-degree counts of rape, two first-degree counts of aggravated kidnapping, one second-degree count of attempted rape and a third-degree felony count of aggravated assault on February 13, 1987. The attempted rape and aggravated assault charges stem from a Feb 8 incident in which Wilcock allegedly demanded sexual favors from Amy Schaefer, 20, of Holladay, in exchange for not citing her for public intoxication. He is accused of firing 13 shots at her when she drove away in his patrol car and called on the car's radio for help. He was found guilty of those charges and sentenced to 5 years in jail.

Safe driving campaigns
"1-877-JAIL-FON" was a phone number created by the Utah Highway Patrol that allowed people to practice the "one phone call" from jail if arrested for impaired driving.  The intention was to get people thinking about the consequences of drinking and driving as well create an open a dialogue between friends. The program targeted the 21-30 age group. Callers selected to speak with a choice of persons who were unhappy about their predicament, and were educated about the consequences of drinking and driving in a humorous manner. The phone number is no longer available.

See also

 List of law enforcement agencies in Utah

Notes

References

https://highwaypatrol.utah.gov/fallen-trooper-memorial/

External links

 
 Utah Highway Patrol Act (within the Utah State Code)
 Utah Highway Patrol Association (official website)
 Utah Highway Patrol Honoring Heroes Foundadation
 Officer Down Memorial Page: Utah Highway Patrol

Highway
Government agencies established in 1923
1923 establishments in Utah